Harsprånget is a hydroelectric power station located on the Lule River in northern Sweden, just downstream of Porjus.

With a power of 977 MW, it's the largest hydroelectric power station in Sweden, and also the fourth largest in the Nordic countries. The name means "Hare Run" in Swedish. This was also the name of the mighty rapids there, and the name was related to the sharp turns in the rapids, a little similar to the ones a hare does when fleeing. Normal year production is around 2131 GWh. Total fall height is around 107 m.

History

Construction of the station started in 1918. However, recession after World War I cancelled the construction, which was not started again before 1945. It was opened in 1951, then with a power of 330 MW. In 1980, two new turbines were installed which increased the max power to 945 MW. The rated power was later increased further.

Turbines

Grand total of 977 MW.

References 

Hydroelectric power stations in Sweden
Vattenfall
Dams completed in 1951
Energy infrastructure completed in 1951
Dams in Sweden
Rock-filled dams
1951 establishments in Sweden